Stephen Hutchings (born 13 December 1990) is an English footballer, who played as a striker for Conference South club Havant & Waterlooville and previously Bournemouth. He now plays for Portsmouth-based Moneyfields FC in the Wessex Football League Premier Division.

Hutchings made his debut for Bournemouth at home to Millwall, in the 2–0 win in League One on 29 March 2008. He joined Conference South side Dorchester Town on a work experience deal on 13 February 2009. He returned to Bournemouth from his work experience deal at Dorchester Town on 30 March 2009. On 18 December 2021 Hutchings scored his 250th goal for Moneyfields against AFC Stoneham.

References

External links
Steve Hutchings player profile at afcb.co.uk

1990 births
Footballers from Portsmouth
Living people
Association football midfielders
English footballers
AFC Bournemouth players
Dorchester Town F.C. players
English Football League players
Havant & Waterlooville F.C. players